Joanna Sakowicz-Kostecka (born May 1, 1984 in Kraków) is a former tennis player from Poland.

As a professional, her highest career singles ranking is world No. 138, achieved on 9 October 2006, her highest career doubles ranking is world No. 312, achieved on 23 June 2003.

In her career, she won three singles titles and one doubles title on the ITF Women's Circuit.

ITF finals

Singles (3–4)

Doubles (1–1)

References
 
 

Polish female tennis players
1984 births
Living people
Sportspeople from Kraków
21st-century Polish women